Mt. Airy No. 27 School is a historic one-room school built  in 1863 in Centreville, New Castle County, Delaware. It was designed and built as a one-room, one-teacher school, and operated as such from 1863 to  1932. It is now used as a private residence.

A gable-roofed portico stands in front of the entrance, with a small bell tower or cupola on the main roof just above it.  Three large six-over-six windows are on each side of the building.

In 1983, at the same time the school was listed the Centreville Historic District, the Joseph Chandler House, and Carpenter-Lippincott House, all located nearby, were also listed.

References

School buildings completed in 1863
Buildings and structures in New Castle County, Delaware
School buildings on the National Register of Historic Places in Delaware
National Register of Historic Places in New Castle County, Delaware